Madhukhali is an upazila of Faridpur District in the Division of Dhaka, Bangladesh.

Geography

It has 29,201 households and a total area of 230.2 km2.

Demographics
As of the 1991 Bangladesh census, Madhukhali had a population of 165,438. Males constituted 51.29% of the population, and females 48.71%. The population aged 18 or over was 83,075. Madhukhali has an average literacy rate of 32.5% (7+ years), compared to the national average of 32.4%.

Administration
Madhukhali Upazila is divided into nine union parishads: Bagat, Dumain, Gazna, Jahapur, Kamarkhali, Madhukhali, Megchami, Nowpara, and Raipur. The union parishads are subdivided into 129 mauzas and 242 villages.

See also
Upazilas of Bangladesh
Districts of Bangladesh
Divisions of Bangladesh

References

Upazilas of Faridpur District